Liberty Softball Stadium is a softball venue in Lynchburg, Virginia. It is the home field of the Liberty Lady Flames softball team, a member of the NCAA Division I Big South Conference. The stadium opened in January, 2015 and has a capacity of 1,000 spectators.

History

Features
The stadium includes 1,000 chairback seats, home, visitor and umpires’ locker rooms, team room, situation room, coaches’ offices, indoor batting tunnels, two full bullpens and an expansive athletic training room. The state-of-the art pressbox houses all game operations, home and visiting radio booths, TV booth and President’s suite.

The stadium features an AstroTurf field, with an artificial dirt infield.

See also
 List of NCAA Division I softball venues

References

External links

College softball venues in the United States
Liberty Lady Flames softball